Dennis Henry Anderson (1866- 1952) was a Methodist minister, educator, and author in Kentucky. He led efforts to establish schools for African Americans in Kentucky.

History

He was born in Tennessee in 1866. He graduated from Lane College in Tennessee. He married Artelia Harris of Virginia, July 14, 1897. He and his wife helped build West Kentucky Industrial College. He worked to get the Kentucky legislature to provide state support for his industrial college. The college struggled for accreditation. As a leader of the college, he tried to frame a political opponent. Management issues were also raised about his leadership.

References

External links
Findagrave entry

1866 births
1952 deaths